For the Zen Buddhist monk, see Keian Genju (1427–1508).
 was a  after Shōhō and before Jōō. This period spanned the years from February 1648 through September 1652.

Change of era
 1648 : The new era name was created in response to criticism that Shōhō was too closely related to Shōbō (焼亡, meaning "death by burning"). The previous era ended and a new one commenced in Shōhō 5, on the 5th day of the 2nd month.

The new era name was drawn from the Chinese classic, The I Ching: "At the end happiness, joy of quiet righteousness, answer the world unlimited" (乃終有慶、安貞之吉、応地無疆):

Events of the Keian era
 April 1, 1649 (Keian 2, 20th day of the 2nd month): There was a major earthquake in Edo.
 1651 (Keian 4):  Keian Uprising. Plans by well-organized rōnin to attack several Tokugawa strongholds simultaneously were timely discovered. The attempt plan to overthrow the Edo Bakufu by Marubashi Chūya and Yui Shōsetsu was thwarted.
 1652 (Keian 5, 5th month):  Nihon Ōdai Ichiran is first published in Kyoto under the patronage of the tairō Sakai Tadakatsu, daimyō of the Obama Domain of Wakasa Province.

Notes

References
 Nussbaum, Louis Frédéric and Käthe Roth. (2005). Japan Encyclopedia. Cambridge: Harvard University Press. ; OCLC 48943301
 Screech, Timon. (2006). Secret Memoirs of the Shoguns: Isaac Titsingh and Japan, 1779–1822. London: RoutledgeCurzon. ; OCLC 65177072
 Titsingh, Isaac. (1834). Nihon Ōdai Ichiran; ou,  Annales des empereurs du Japon.  Paris: Royal Asiatic Society, Oriental Translation Fund of Great Britain and Ireland. OCLC 5850691

External links
 National Diet Library, "The Japanese Calendar" -- historical overview plus illustrative images from library's collection

Japanese eras
1640s in Japan
1650s in Japan